Sosthenes  (Greek: Σωσθένης, Sōsthénēs, "safe in strength") was the chief ruler of the synagogue at Corinth, who, according to the Acts of the Apostles, was seized and beaten by the mob in the presence of Gallio, the Roman governor, when Gallio refused to proceed against Paul at the instigation of the Jews. The motives of this assault against Sosthenes are not recorded. Some manuscripts insert the mob was composed of "Greeks"; others read "Jews".

Some historians identify this Sosthenes with a companion of Paul the Apostle referred to as "Sosthenes our brother" (Sōsthénēs ho adelphós, literally "Sosthenes the brother"), a convert to the Christian faith and co-author of the First Epistle to the Corinthians. It is not clear whether this identification is tenable. According to Protestant theologian Heinrich Meyer, "Theodoret and most commentators, including Flatt, Billroth, Ewald, Maier [and] Hofmann, identify Sosthenes with the person so named in Acts 18:17, but this is denied by Michaelis, Pott, Rückert, and de Wette". The name was a common one.

It has also been suggested that Sosthenes is a later name of Crispus, who is mentioned in Acts 18:8 and 1 Corinthians 1:14, but Strong and McClintock say that "is arbitrary and unsupported." 

References 

Seventy disciples
Year of birth missing
Year of death missing
People in Acts of the Apostles
Saints of Roman Corinth
Christian saints from the New Testament
First Epistle to the Corinthians